Tingena paratrimma is a species of moth in the family Oecophoridae. It is endemic to New Zealand and has been observed in the lower parts of the South Island. George Hudson regarded this species are uncommon. The adults of this species are on the wing from November to February.

Taxonomy
This species was first described in 1910 by Edward Meyrick using two specimens collected by Alfred Philpott in Invercargill in December. Meyrick originally named this species Borkhausenia paratrimma. In 1911 Meyrick redescribed this species. In 1917 Alfred Philpott discussed the species. George Hudson discussed and illustrated this species in his 1928 book The butterflies and moths of New Zealand also under the same name. In 1988 J. S. Dugdale placed this species in the genus Tingena. The male lectotype specimen, collected at Invercargill, is held in the Natural History Museum, London.

Description

Meyrick described this species as follows:

Meyrick redescribed this species in 1911 as follows:

This species is similar in appearance to T. sigerodeta but differs in that T. paratrimma has broader wings, grey coloured hindwings and lacks the dark fuscous irroration on the forewings that can be found on specimens of T. siderodeta.

Distribution
This species is endemic to New Zealand. It has been observed in the southern parts of the South Island, including at Invercargill, Dunedin and at Coronet Peak. Hudson regarded this species as rare.

Behaviour
Adults of this species are on the wing from November to February.

References

Oecophoridae
Moths of New Zealand
Moths described in 1910
Endemic fauna of New Zealand
Taxa named by Edward Meyrick
Endemic moths of New Zealand